Goodnow may refer to:

Places in the United States
 Goodnow, Wisconsin
 Goodnow House, Manhattan, Kansas
 Merton S. Goodnow House, Hutchinson, Minnesota
 Goodnow Library, Sudbury, Massachusetts
 Goodnow Mountain, Adirondacks, New York

People with the surname
 Chris Goodnow (born 1959), professor and Australian immunologist
 David Goodnow, American television journalist
 Edward Samuel Goodnow (1874–-1939)
 Frank Johnson Goodnow (1859–1939), American educator and legal scholar
 Isaac Goodnow (1814–1894), abolitionist and co-founder of Kansas State University
 Jacqueline Jarrett Goodnow (1924–2014), cognitive and developmental psychologist
 Minnie Goodnow (1871-1952), American nurse

See also
 Goodnow Hall (disambiguation)